Bhalobasar Onek Naam is a Bengali romantic drama film directed by Tarun Majumdar based on a short story of Bibhutibhushan Bandopadhyay. This film was released in 2006 under the banner of Aladain Entertainment. This is the debut movie of Gourab Chatterjee, grandson of Uttam Kumar and Megha Mukherjee, granddaughter of Hemanta Mukherjee.

Plot
Bimal, a young man come to Balaspur village as a school teacher. All the villagers specially ticket collector Kailash and a school teacher Manirul loves him a lot. He befriends Bini, a housewife who exactly resembles his elder sister. But few people think that they have illicit love affairs. Actually Bimal likes Bini's sister Sumi. On the other side local station master Shashi tries to fix his daughter Bulbuli's marriage with Bimal. One day Bimal's cousin come to Bilaspur offering a better job for him but Bimal refuses to leave the village due to immense love and affections. He marries Sumi and stays at Bilaspur.

Cast 
 Gourab Chatterjee as Bimal
 Soumitra Chatterjee as Manirul
 Paran Banerjee as Kailash
 Moushumi Chatterjee as Bini
 Megha Mukherjee as Sumi
 Manoj Mitra as Shashi
 Tapas Pal as Bini's husband
 Biplab Chatterjee
 Pijush Ganguly as Bimal's cousin
 Biplabketan Chakraborty as Nakul

References

External links
 

2006 films
2006 romantic drama films
Bengali-language Indian films
Films based on Indian novels
Indian romantic drama films
Films directed by Tarun Majumdar
2000s Bengali-language films
Films based on works by Bibhutibhushan Bandyopadhyay